Hardee's Restaurants LLC is an American fast-food restaurant chain operated by CKE Restaurants Holdings, Inc. ("CKE") with locations primarily in the Southern and Midwestern United States. The company has evolved through several corporate ownerships since its establishment in 1961 in North Carolina.

In April 1997, CKE Restaurants Holdings, Inc., the parent company of Carl's Jr., paid $327 million to Montreal-based Imasco Limited for Hardee's. The merger created a chain of 3,828 restaurants – 3,152 Hardee's outlets in 40 states and 10 foreign countries and 676 Carl's Jr. outlets, primarily in California. In June 2018, former CKE CEO Jason Marker announced that Carl's Jr. and Hardee's would become separate brands, claiming that CKE's racy advertising and marketing campaigns were incompatible with a family-oriented chain like Hardee's. In April 2019 Ned Lyerly, a 30-year veteran of the company & formerly President of CKE's International division, was named CEO replacing Jason Marker.

History
Wilber Hardee (1918–2008) opened his namesake restaurant in Greenville, North Carolina, on September 3, 1960. After a year of success, Wilber decided to look into expanding his restaurant and opening another location so he met with James Gardner and Leonard Rawls to discuss doing so. Shortly thereafter, the first company store was opened in Rocky Mount, North Carolina, in May 1961 by James Carson Gardner and Leonard Rawls on McDonald Street on North Church Street in Rocky Mount, known within the chain as building number 1. That location was demolished in 2007 and replaced with a veterans' park named for Jack Laughery, a former Hardee's chairman and military veteran.

According to Wilber Hardee, Gardner and Rawls won a controlling share of the company from him during a game of poker. After realizing that he had lost control over his namesake company, Hardee sold his remaining shares to them as well.

However, this story has been disputed by Gardner & Rawls, who bought out Wilber Hardee and began establishing franchises in 1961. According to Jack Laughery, CEO of Hardee's from 1975 to 1990, "Leonard put together an organization with relatively little capital.  If it weren't for him and Jim Gardner, there wouldn't be anything of Hardee's Food Systems."

Rawls and Gardner sold their first franchises to a small group of longtime friends and acquaintances who formed their own companies and over time, built hundreds more franchised locations. Hardee's Food Systems went public in 1963 with Rawls as president. Gardner, who was vice president, had political ambitions and left the company when he was elected to the United States House of Representatives in 1966.

The 1964 menu included hamburger for 15 cents, cheeseburgers for 20 cents, french fries for 10 cents, apple turnovers for 15 cents, milk for 12 cents, coffee for 10 cents, soft drinks for 10 cents, and milkshakes (chocolate-strawberry-vanilla) for 20 cents. Strawberry milkshakes were created from vanilla by addition of a berry syrup which had to be mixed with a spindle.

At the end of the 1960s, the corporation operated nearly 200 restaurants in the Midwest and Southwestern U.S., as well as its first international locations in West Germany. Around this same time, Hardee's began an expansion into the mid-Atlantic states, notably Southeastern Pennsylvania, southern New Jersey, and Delaware.  The expansion was done via the franchisee Hardee Northern, Inc, which was a subsidiary of Acme Markets, a prominent grocery store chain based in Philadelphia.

Hardee's purchased Sandy's in 1972. During the mid-and-late 1970s, Hardee's saw rapid chain growth and high profits on the strength of its two key sandwiches: the "Big Twin" and the "Big Deluxe". Another acquisition occurred in the late 1970s when Hardee's purchased the Utah-based burger chain Dee's Drive-In. 

Hardee's was purchased by Canadian company Imasco Limited in 1981. In 1982, General Foods sold Burger Chef to Imasco for $44 million. Imasco converted many locations to Hardee's restaurants and let franchises and locations near existing Hardee's locations convert to other brands. Remaining restaurants that did not convert to Hardee's or new names and branding simply closed.

A new management team, in the early 1980s, seeking to cut costs, changed the signature burger recipe and eliminated the flagship menu item, the Big Twin. The Big Deluxe continued to be offered throughout the 1990s.

For a few years after acquiring the Roy Rogers Restaurants fast food chain in the early 1990s, Hardee's outlets sold fried chicken prepared using the popular Roy Rogers Restaurant recipe hoping it could compete with KFC. In addition to Roy Rogers, Hardee's also owned Rax Roast Beef for a period of time and sold roast beef sandwiches throughout the Hardee's system.

In April 1997, CKE Restaurants Holdings, Inc., the parent company of Carl's Jr., bought Hardee's from Imasco for $327 million. The merger created a chain of 3,828 restaurants – 3,152 Hardee's outlets in 40 states and 10 foreign countries and 676 Carl's Jr. outlets primarily in California.

In 2001, Hardee's headquarters moved to St. Louis, Missouri. In 2005, Hardee's introduced Hand-Scooped Ice Cream Shakes & Malts.

In September 2013, it was announced that Hardee's would expand into the Northeastern United States. In April 2015, Hardee's announced the opening of its 300th restaurant in the Middle East with longtime franchisee, The Americana Group.

In 2015, Nation's Restaurant News ranked Hardee's as the No. 28 foodservice chain by sales in the United States through 2011. Carl's Jr. was ranked at No. 37. Combined sales would rank the two at No. 15. In 2013, QSR listed Hardee's at No. 20 and Carl's Jr. at No. 24; if combined they would have been listed at No. 14.

In July 2015, Hardee's announced that it would be offering The All-Natural Burger, which launched at sister-chain Carl's Jr. restaurants in December 2014.

As of March 2016, CKE has a total of 3,664 franchised or company-operated restaurants in 44 states and 37 foreign countries and U.S. territories.

Controversies, disputes, and legal issues

Burger Chef trademark dispute
In January 2007, Hardee's had a challenge filed against it with the U.S. Patents and Trademarks Office by River West Brands, LLC of Chicago for the use of the Burger Chef trademark and name. Shortly thereafter, Hardee's reissued the Burger Chef Big Shef sandwich in Terre Haute, Indiana, as a trial offering and later in additional Indiana markets and Dayton, Ohio for a limited time. The reissue of the Big Shef has also used the Burger Chef name and logo in advertisements in the markets in which it is offered, and has claimed to provide Burger Chef fans with their Big Shef "fix". On April 16, 2009, River West Brands dropped their petition for cancellation and both parties agreed to pay their own attorney's fees.

Harvey's controversy
Due to a trademark dispute with Canada's Harvey's burger chain, the Hardee's brand name cannot be used in the country. Instead, CKE Restaurants operates exclusively under the Carl's Jr. banner.

Advertising

A new Hardee's logo was unveiled in 2006 that featured script lettering and retained the iconic Happy Star, further unifying the Hardee's and Carl's Jr. brands. Hardee's also marketed special Super Bowl celebratory pins in the early 1990s.

Controversy
Several Hardee's ad campaigns in the 2000s have been criticized by groups including Parents Television Council for their sexually suggestive nature. A campaign titled "More Than a Piece of Meat" featured scantily clad women appearing to receive sexual gratification from consuming Hardee's products, and "Name Our Holes" — an ad campaign and website promoting Hardee's Biscuit Holes.

In January 2015, Carl's Jr. released a commercial online featuring model Charlotte McKinney advertising its new All Natural Burger to air regionally during Super Bowl XLIX. The ad features McKinney walking around a farmers' market, implying that she is "all natural" and uses double entendres to suggest that she is naked with strategically placed items in the market until it reveals McKinney in a bikini eating the All Natural Burger. Critics suggest that the ad "sets feminism back four decades," while others, including McKinney's elderly grandfather, enjoyed the ad. Until the YouTube video of the ad got privatized by Carl's Jr in March 2017, it had over 13 million views and 10 thousand likes.

Carl Hardee Sr. campaign
In March 2017, Hardee's began to move away from the sexualized ads by releasing a commercial featuring a white bearded character played by Charles Esten as "Carl Hardee Sr." who had come back into the office (much to the delight of the employees) to find his son (Drew Tarver), a.k.a. "Carl Jr." who was focusing on sex appeal over its food. The commercial marked a turning point in CKE's advertising, as the company wanted to move away from its provocative ads and focus more on food and as a competitor to Five Guys, Steak 'n Shake, and In-N-Out Burger. "Carl Hardee Sr." was also expected to become the new company spokesperson.

Tastes Like America
In 2018, CKE resumed producing separate campaigns for their Hardee's and Carl's Jr. brands. For Hardee's, it started the Tastes Like America campaign with music by Big Wet. For this campaign, Hardee's restored its 1976 logo, now in white; however, the Happy Star still appears, replacing the A in "Tastes". The previous logo will also continue to be used as well.

International franchises
Many international Hardee's franchises are located in countries in the Middle East and Pakistan, most being owned and operated by Americana Group. The Americana Group opened the Middle East's first Hardee's restaurant in Kuwait in June 1980. As of 2016, there are over 300 Hardee's restaurants throughout Asia and the Middle East, specifically in Bahrain, Egypt, Iraq, Jordan, Kazakhstan, Kuwait, Lebanon, Oman, Pakistan, Qatar, Saudi Arabia, United Arab Emirates, and plans to open in Israel. Singapore had a Hardee's franchise first opened in 1984, but the last three outlets closed in 1988. Hardee's opened a store in South Korea in 1990, but it pulled in 2004, due to poor performance. Hardee's also used to operate in Hong Kong, but it pulled out in 2006, due to licensing issues with its US parent. Specifically, in the Middle East, the Hardee's menu does not include any pork items and each beef is certified Halal due to religious and cultural beliefs. The same menu is offered at Hardee's locations in Pakistan, which opened its first location in the country in 2009 in Lahore. Hardee's currently has eighteen locations in Pakistan, with six in Lahore, four in Karachi, two each  in Islamabad & Rawalpindi and one each in Faisalabad, Bhera, Peshawar and Multan. In 2014, it opened a restaurant in Erbil, Iraqi Kurdistan.

There is also a Hardee's location at Jomo Kenyatta International Airport in Nairobi, Kenya, Africa.

See also
 Carl's Jr.
 Jack Laughery

References

External links

 

CKE Restaurants
Companies based in St. Louis
Economy of the Midwestern United States
Economy of the Southeastern United States
Fast-food chains of the United States
Fast-food franchises
Fast-food hamburger restaurants
Regional restaurant chains in the United States
Restaurants established in 1960
1960 establishments in North Carolina
Roast beef restaurants in the United States